Granadilla is a locality in the Cassowary Coast Region, Queensland, Australia.

History 
Granadilla State School opened on 1937 and closed circa 1941.

The locality was officially named and bounded on 21 January 2000.

References 

Cassowary Coast Region
Localities in Queensland